The Singing Bee is a sing-along game show that originally aired on NBC and then CMT.  Combining karaoke singing with a spelling bee-style competition, this show features contestants trying to remember the lyrics to popular songs. Originally slated to begin with a six episode season during late 2007, it launched early in reaction to Fox's competing Don't Forget the Lyrics!

Timeline

Broadcast history
The Singing Bee premiered with a half-hour episode on July 10, 2007 at 9:30pm Eastern/8:30pm Central, beating Don't Forget the Lyrics! to the air by one day.  The premiere episode was repeated the following night, July 11, 2007, at 8:30pm Eastern/7:30pm Central. On NBC, it was hosted by Joey Fatone. The house band, The Groove, was led by Ray Chew and features: Deanna Johnston, Paula MacNeill, Wes Quave, Tom Sartori, Storm Lee, Kelli Sae, Jeschelle Magbitang, Carmen Carter, Kara Shaw, Leah Shaffer, Karen Ashe, Christopher "C.J." Emmons, Vann Johnson and Chris "Breeze" Barczynski. The back-up singers were Toni Scruggs and Tanya Diona.  Dancing to the band are the house dancers, The Honeybees: Ferly Prado Dunn, Monique Cash, Holly Cruikshank, and Lisa Byrne.

Melissa Peterman hosted the CMT version. The house band, Steve Dorff and the Bee Hive, also featured: Roger Cain, Scotty Kormos, Tony Love, and Jeff Vincent. The singers were Jared Johnson, Baylie Brown, Beau Davidson, Paula MacNeill, Kim Parent, and Bobby Tomberlin.

In each episode, six contestants (four contestants in season two) will be selected from the audience to play a series of games that test their knowledge of song lyrics.  If a contestant makes an error, he or she will forfeit her chance to get into the "musical chairs". If a contestant is not in a musical chair when the round is over, he or she is eliminated.

In a promo for the show's launch, NBC revived their original 1983 slogan "Be There" as "Bee There".

Due to low ratings, and to make room for The Biggest Loser, NBC put The Singing Bee on hiatus for November sweeps.  The Singing Bee returned on December 21, 2007, and aired two new episodes each Friday, before being placed on hiatus again. On April 2, 2008, NBC announced its schedule for the 2008-2009 television season. The Singing Bee was left off this list, and is officially canceled. A spin-off of the show, The Singing Office, debuted on June 29, 2008, hosted by Fatone and Mel B and airing on TLC.

On April 29, 2009, CMT confirmed that it would revive the series in the summer of 2009 with Melissa Peterman as host. The Singing Bee premiered on CMT on June 20 and will now air every Saturday at 9pm. Melissa Peterman confirmed the show was renewed for another season on August 24, 2009. In November, 2010 CMT reportedly picked up the show for a third season. The show's last episode aired on July 23, 2012.

Format

As mentioned, at the start of the show, the band plays a song and the host "randomly" gives audience members a chance to sing part of the song. If they sing it correctly, they become one of the contestants on the show. This part of the show is actually staged, and the contestants are preselected.  During this part of the program, you can sometimes see (as the contestants run up to the stage) that the lyrics for the song are being scrolled on a banner over the stage so that the preselected contestants don't make a mistake.

Round 1

The host would provide the year the song was released, the performer, and the name of the song. A portion of the song is performed, and then the contestant has to attempt to sing the next line of the song. If correct, they advance to the next round, and a new song is introduced, which the next contestant in line must attempt; if not, they have to step back, and the next person in line tries the same song. A song is thrown out if none of the remaining contestants get the lyrics correct. The first four people (three people in season two) who get a song lyric correct move on to the second round, and any contestant who hasn't had a chance loses and returns on a future episode.

Round 2

The contestants who advanced go up in pairs to play a mini-game. The winner of the game advances to the championship round.  In the CMT version, all four contestants play 3 mini-games for points, the two players with the most points moves on to the Chorus Showdown.

 "Scrambled Lyrics" (Renamed Random Shuffle): To play "Scrambled Lyrics", while the band is performing, words from the next line are shown scrambled on screen. The contestant is required to sing the line in its correct order. When one contestant is correct and the other is wrong at any point, the one who was correct moves on to the Championship Round.  On the CMT Version, each correct answer is worth five points.
 "Karaoke Challenge": To play "Karaoke Challenge", while the band is performing, the contestant sees the words to the song in karaoke fashion. As the contestant sings the song, he or she will also see blanks, each representing a word in the song. The player who fills in the most blanks correctly (out of a possible 15) wins and goes on to the Championship Round. This round is similar to FOX's Don't Forget the Lyrics! because the contestant is the lead singer in this round.  In the CMT version, each blank is worth two points (30 maximum).
 "Blind Start": To play "Blind Start", the band plays the beginning notes of a song. When the band stops, the contestant must sing the opening line correctly. One of the three contestants is eliminated from the second round.
 "Playlist": To play "Playlist", the three contestants are given 6 categories of song which have comical titles. Whichever two contestants have the most points after the 6 songs move on to the next round.
 "Singing with the Enemy": To play "Singing With The Enemy", the band plays part of a popular song. The first contestant must do the next line when the band stops playing. The band then picks up with the line the contestant said and stops. The next contestant continues on with the song. This goes through 3 passes. The two with the highest score move on.  On the CMT version, up to 15 points are possible.

Chorus Showdown

This follows a similar format to the first round, but instead of singing a line, the contestant is required to sing the entire chorus without mistakes from the song performed. If both are correct or incorrect (sometimes after two rounds), then they go to a tiebreaker, where they are given the year and the name of the performer and the first person to buzz in will be given the option of singing or passing. If the singer is correct, they win. If the singer is wrong, the other contestant wins.

The winner moves on to the Final Countdown.

In the CMT version, Peterman gives the year, artist, but not the name of the song just yet.  Then, the contestant in the lead gets the choice to play that song or pass it, then they give the name of the song.

The Final Countdown

In the NBC version, Ray Chew introduces this concluding round by announcing in song: "It's the Final Countdown!" Up to 7 songs are performed in a similar manner to the first round, but the contestant knows nothing about the song, (artist, title, year) and thus must use the lyrics in order to win the big money. For each song lyric that is sung correctly, the player wins $5,000. If the player gets five right, then they win $50,000. However, if they sing a lyric incorrectly, a strike is given. If three strikes are given at any point, the game is over, but the contestant still wins whatever money was accumulated up to that point. Beginning in the second season, the winning contestant also defends as champion title to face three more challengers. On the new CMT version of the show, correctly guessing a song earns $500, and getting five wins $10,000.

Changes for One-Hour Shows

The above format is the standard for a 30-minute episode of the show.

In a one-hour show, several changes are made:

 There are two qualifying games.
 In each game, six players (only 5 for season 2) are picked from the audience to play Round 1, however, the first three to complete a lyric (only 5 for season 2) advance.
 The three players then compete in a Round 2 game. Play continues, including a tie-breaker if needed, until one player remains. In season 2, three rounds are played until three contestants are eliminated.
 The two survivors of the qualifying games play the Chorus Showdown, the last player standing plays The Final Countdown.
Beginning on August 21, in between some breaks, host Fatone goes into the audience to give an audience member a chance at $500. A question about a song is asked, and if the player gets it right, he/she wins the money. On December 28, two audience members were challenged to the same lyrics. The contestant who will wait is given headphones  so that they cannot hear  the other contestant until the song is completed. If both contestants are correct, both win $500. If only one is correct, that contestant wins $1,000.

Ratings
The first episode premiered with 13.1 million viewers.  It was the biggest summer premiere since ABC's premiere of Dancing with the Stars. The debut episode finished second for the week of July 9–15, 2007, by an extremely close margin. The number one program, the 2007 MLB All-Star Game, beat "Bee" with an 8.4 rating, to the game show's 8.1

However, The Singing Bee hit an all-time low in the ratings with a 1.7 rating, on October 30, 2007. On December 28, 2007, the show scored a 3.7/7 rating, and came in second place behind Ghost Whisperer, before NBC announced its cancellation. The show would eventually be revived by CMT in 2009, running until 2012.

Seasons

International versions
 Currently airing franchise
 Franchise no longer in production

*Prior to the premiere of the American version, British Network ITV had its own version of the show titled Sing It Back: Lyric Champion. 2M TV in Morocco already had their own version of the show since 2005, called Fasilah, but since September 2007 they changed the rules into that of the American version.

References

External links
 NBC's official The Singing Bee Site
 CMT's official The Singing Bee Site
 

2007 American television series debuts
2012 American television series endings
2000s American game shows
2010s American game shows
NBC original programming
Musical game shows
Karaoke television series
2000s American music television series
2010s American music television series
American television series revived after cancellation
CMT (American TV channel) original programming
English-language television shows